Francisco Emmanuel "Pacoy" Ortega III is a Filipino politician from La Union, Philippines who served as the Governor of La Union from 2016-2022. He was elected to two terms as Governor of La Union. He first won election to Governor in 2016 and was re-elected in 2019.

References

External links
Province of La Union Official Website

Living people
PDP–Laban politicians
1967 births
Governors of La Union
Party-list members of the House of Representatives of the Philippines